The 2013–14 Wofford Terriers men's basketball team represented Wofford College during the 2013–14 NCAA Division I men's basketball season. The Terriers, led by 12th year head coach Mike Young, played their home games at the Benjamin Johnson Arena and were members of the Southern Conference. They finished the season 20–13, 11–5 in SoCon ply to finish in a tie for third place. They were champions of the SoCon tournament to earn an automatic bid to the NCAA tournament where they lost in the second round to Michigan.

Roster

Schedule 

|-
!colspan=9 style="background:#000000; color:#CFB53B;"| Regular season

|-
!colspan=9 style="background:#000000; color:#CFB53B;"| SoCon tournament

|-
!colspan=9 style="background:#000000; color:#CFB53B;"| NCAA tournament

References 

Wofford Terriers men's basketball seasons
Wofford
Wofford
Wolf
Wolf